SM U-5 or U-V was the lead boat of the U-5 class of submarines or U-boats built for and operated by the Austro-Hungarian Navy before and during the First World War. The submarine was built as part of a plan to evaluate foreign submarine designs, and was the first of three boats of the class built by Whitehead & Co. of Fiume after a design by Irishman John Philip Holland.

U-5 was laid down in April 1907 and launched in February 1909. U-5s design had inadequate ventilation and exhaust from her twin gasoline engines often intoxicated the crew. The boat was commissioned into the Austro-Hungarian Navy in April 1910, and served as a training boat—sometimes making as many as ten cruises a month—through the beginning of the First World War in 1914.

The submarine scored most of her wartime successes during the first year of the war while under the command of Georg Ritter von Trapp. The French armoured cruiser Léon Gambetta, sunk in April 1915, was the largest ship sunk by U-5. The sinking of Italian troop transport ship  in June 1916 with the loss of 1,926 men, was the worst naval disaster of World War I in terms of human lives lost. In May 1917, U-5 hit a mine and sank with the loss of six men. She was raised, rebuilt, and recommissioned, but sank no more ships. At the end of the war, U-5 was ceded to Italy as a war reparation, and scrapped in 1920. In all, U-5 sank three ships totaling  and 12,641 tons.

Design and construction 
U-5 was built as part of a plan by the Austro-Hungarian Navy to competitively evaluate foreign submarine designs from Simon Lake, Germaniawerft, and John Philip Holland. The Austro-Hungarian Navy authorized the construction of U-5 (and sister ship, U-6) in 1906 by Whitehead & Co. of Fiume. The boat was designed by American John Philip Holland and licensed by Holland and his company, Electric Boat. U-5 was laid down on 9 April 1907 in the United States, partially assembled, and shipped to Whitehead's for final assembly, a process which, author Edwin Sieche notes, "caused a lot of trouble". She was launched at Fiume on 10 February 1909 by Agathe Whitehead, and towed to Pola on 17 August.

U-5s design featured a single-hull with a teardrop-shaped body that bore a strong resemblance to modern nuclear submarines. She displaced  surfaced, and  submerged. Her two  bow torpedo tubes featured unique, cloverleaf-shaped design hatches that rotated on a central axis, and the boat was designed to carry up to four torpedoes. For surface running, U-5 was outfitted with 2 gasoline engines, but suffered from inadequate ventilation, which resulted in frequent intoxication of the crew; her underwater propulsion was by two electric motors. The U-5 was christened by Agathe Whitehead on 10 February 1909.

Service career 
U-5 was commissioned into the Austro-Hungarian Navy on 1 April 1910, with Linienschiffsleutnant Urban Passerar in command. Over the next three years she served primarily as a training boat, making as many as ten training cruises per month. On 1 May 1911, she hosted a delegation of Peruvian Navy officers that inspected her. In June 1912, she towed a balloon as part of efforts to assess the underwater visibility of hull paint schemes.

At the outbreak of World War I, U-5 was one of only four fully operational U-boats in the Austro-Hungarian Navy fleet. She was initially stationed at the submarine base on Brioni, but was moved to Cattaro by late 1914. U-5 made an unsuccessful attack on a French battleship squadron off Punta Stilo on 3 November. In December, the ship's armament was augmented by a 3.7 cm/23 (1.5 in) quick-firing (QF) deck gun, and had her first radio receiver installed.
On the night of 26 April, Léon Gambetta was patrolling the Straits of Otranto at a leisurely  without the benefit of a destroyer screen. U-5 launched two torpedoes at the French cruiser, hitting with both. The ship was rocked by the explosions of the two torpedoes and went down in ten minutes, taking down with her the entire complement of officers, including Rear Admiral Victor Baptistin Sénès. Of the French ship's complement, 648 were killed in the attack; there were 137 survivors. Léon Gambetta was the largest ship of any kind sunk by U-5.

In June, U-5 helped search for the lost Austro-Hungarian seaplane L 41, and in July, received an upgrade of her deck gun to a  QF gun. In early August, U-5 was sent out from Lissa when the Austro-Hungarian Navy received word from a reconnaissance aircraft that an Italian submarine had been sighted at Pelagosa. When U-5 surfaced just offshore, Nereides commanding officer, Capitano di Corvetta Carlo del Greco, cast off the lines and maneuvered to get a shot at von Trapp's boat. Nereide launched a single torpedo at U-5 that missed, after which del Greco ordered his boat submerged. U-5 lined up a shot and launched a single torpedo at the slowly submerging target, striking her, and sending her to the bottom with all hands. The Italian captain received the Medaglia d'Oro al Valore Militare for his actions. At the end of August, U-5 captured the  Greek steamer Cefalonia as a prize off Durazzo. In late November, Friedrich Schlosser succeeded von Trapp as U-5s commanding officer.

According to a contemporary account, Principe Umberto and two other ships were transporting troops and materiel under escort of two destroyers. After the torpedo hit, Principe Umberto went down quickly with the loss 1,750 men. Principe Umberto was the last ship hit by U-5.

On 16 May 1917, U-5 was conducting a training cruise in the Fasana Channel near Pula when her stern struck a mine. From 20 to 24 May the submarine was raised, and through November underwent a refit. During this reconditioning, a new conning tower was added and the deck gun was upgraded again, this time to a 7.5 cm/30 (3.0 in) gun. Upon completion, U-5 was recommissioned, but had no more war successes. In her career, U-5 sank a total of three ships totaling  and 12,641 tons. After the war's end, U-5 was transferred to Venice where she was inspected by British military commissions. U-5 was later ceded to Italy as a war reparation in 1920 and was scrapped.

Summary of raiding history

Gallery

Victims gallery

Notes

References

Bibliography 

 
 
 
 
 
 
 
 
 

1909 ships
U-5-class submarines
U-boats commissioned in 1910
World War I submarines of Austria-Hungary
U-boats sunk by mines
Ships built in Fiume